In music, a stab is a single staccato note or chord that adds dramatic punctuation to a composition. Stabs are usually provided by horns (real or synthesized), thus the term horn stab, or an orchestral sample and usually occur on a 1-beat. Stabs are used in a wide variety of music genres including jazz, rock, classical, funk, freestyle, trap, EDM, metal and ska. See orchestra hit for audio samples. There is no standardized notation symbol to specifically indicate a stab. They are most commonly notated as a short note value with a staccato dot, sometimes with the verbal marking "stab".

Stabs are also used in electronic music in the form of very short snippets of a song used as rhythmic accents in a new composition. Early breakbeat hardcore, such as Prodigy's "Fire", and hip hop in general made use of stabs.

See also
Orchestra hit
Punch (music)

References

Chords
Funk
Breakbeat hardcore